Leonidas Pyrrhus Lee, born as Leonidas Pyrrhus Funkhouser (December 13, 1860 – June 11, 1912) was an American professional player who played one season in Major League Baseball as an outfielder for the  St. Louis Brown Stockings.  He made his major league debut for the Brown Stockings on July 17, 1877, and in four games with the club, he collected five hits, including a double, in 18 at bats for a .278 batting average. His father, Robert Funkhouser, was a successful St. Louis businessman. A graduate of Princeton University, Lee played on both the school's baseball and football team. He later became a doctor. Lee died at the age of 51 in Hendersonville, North Carolina of Myocarditis, and is interred at Rosehill Cemetery in Chicago, Illinois.

References

External links

19th-century baseball players
Major League Baseball outfielders
St. Louis Brown Stockings players
Baseball players from Missouri
Princeton Tigers baseball players
1860 births
1912 deaths
Burials at Rosehill Cemetery